The 1987 Fila German Open was a women's tennis tournament played on outdoor clay courts at the Rot-Weiss Tennis Club in West Berlin, West Germany that was part of the Category 3 tier of the 1987 Virginia Slims World Championship Series. It was the 18th edition of the tournament and was held from 11 May through 17 May 1987. First-seeded Steffi Graf won the singles title, her second consecutive at the event, and earned $29,000 first-prize money.

Finals

Singles
 Steffi Graf defeated  Claudia Kohde-Kilsch 6–2, 6–3
 It was Graf's 6th singles title of the year and the 14th of her career.

Doubles
 Claudia Kohde-Kilsch /  Helena Suková defeated  Catarina Lindqvist /  Tine Scheuer-Larsen 6–1, 6–2

References

External links
 ITF tournament edition details

German Open
WTA German Open
1987 in West German sport
German